Pogonocherus hispidulus, the greater thorn-tipped longhorn beetle, is a species of flat-faced longhorns beetle in the family Cerambycidae.

Description
The basic color of the body is gray-black, with a wide whitish transverse band on scutellum. It has white marked antennae and a long tooth at the apex of each elytron. Adults can be found from April until August. The larvae are polyphagous, feeding in deciduous trees on small dead branches and dead twigs. The development usually takes two years.

Distribution
This beetle is present in most of Europe, in Caucasus, Russia, the Near East and in Turkey.

Habitat
This species lives on deciduous trees and shrubs.

References
 Biolib
 Fauna Europaea

External links
 
 
 Nature spot
  InvertebrateIreland Online

Pogonocherini
Beetles described in 1783